Orchelimum minor, known generally as the lesser pine katydid or lesser pine meadow katydid, is a species of meadow katydid in the family Tettigoniidae. It is found in North America.

References

minor
Articles created by Qbugbot
Insects described in 1891